Edmund Joseph "Cotton" Minahan (December 10, 1882 – May 20, 1958) was a professional baseball player, and American track and field athlete who competed at the 1900 Summer Olympics in Paris, France.

Early life and education
Minahan was born in Springfield, Ohio and was one of 10 brothers and sisters, while young his family moved to Orange, New Jersey, and was educated at Georgetown University and Manhattan College, he competed for the Georgetown Hoyas.

Athletics 

In June 1900, Minahan set sail for England with fellow club teammates William Holland and Arthur Duffey to compete in the Amateur Athletic Association of England Games, then they headed to Paris to compete in the 1900 Summer Olympics.
Minahan competed in the 60 metres event, placing fourth overall. He placed second in his initial heat with an unknown time (though the winner ran it in 7.0 seconds) before coming in fourth of four in the final with an estimated time of 7.2 seconds.

Minahan also went on to run in the 100 metres, finishing in 12th or 13th place overall. He took second in his heat behind Norman Pritchard to advance to the semifinals, but placed fourth in his semi final so didn't advance to the final or the repechage.

Baseball 
Minahan played as a right-handed pitcher for the  season with the Cincinnati Reds. For his career, he compiled a 0–2 record, with a 1.29 earned run average, and 4 strikeouts in 14 innings pitched. He was the first athlete in history to have been an Olympian in a non-baseball sport and also play in major league baseball, preceding Jim Thorpe and Eddy Alvarez.

Death
Minahan died on May 20, 1958 in East Orange, New Jersey at the age of 75.

References

 De Wael, Herman. Herman's Full Olympians: "Athletics 1900". Accessed 18 March 2006.

External links 

1882 births
1958 deaths
Sportspeople from Springfield, Ohio
Cincinnati Reds players
Major League Baseball pitchers
Baseball players from Ohio
Birmingham Barons players
Toledo Mud Hens players
St. Paul Saints (AA) players
Rochester Bronchos players
Georgetown Hoyas baseball players
Manhattan Jaspers baseball players
Olympic track and field athletes of the United States
Athletes (track and field) at the 1900 Summer Olympics
American male sprinters
Track and field athletes from Ohio
Georgetown Hoyas men's track and field athletes